Dharma Realm Buddhist University (DRBU) is an American private nonprofit university located in Ukiah, California, just over 100 miles north of San Francisco, in Mendocino County. It was established in 1976 by Venerable Master Hsuan Hua. It is situated in the monastic setting of the City of Ten Thousand Buddhas, a Mahayana Buddhist monastery. DRBU follows a unique variation of the Great Books model, incorporating texts from both East and West. The university has a longstanding partnership with the Pacific School of Religion and the Graduate Theological Union, as well as the Dharma Realm Buddhist Association.

History 

In 1976, Dharma Realm Buddhist University was formally established at the City of Ten Thousand Buddhas, with the very first class arriving in 1977. The first Chancellor was  Venerable Master Hsuan Hua. Other founding members include Bhikshuni Heng Hsien and Professor Ron Epstein. From 1977 to 1984, DRBU operated with the authorization status given by the California Postsecondary Education Commission. In 1976, the Institute of World Religions was created by  Hsuan Hua and Paul Cardinal Yu Bin. In 1984, DRBU attained Approval to Operate as a California Degree-Granting Institution pursuant to the California Education Code, Section 94310 [c] and is currently approved to operate under the California Bureau for Private Postsecondary Education (BPPE). In 1986, DRBU hosted the Conference on World Religions for the first time in California. In 1994, the Institute of World Religions moved to Berkeley Buddhist Monastery. In 1997, DRBU began its partnership with the Graduate Theological Union and Pacific School of Religion. In 2000, the Venerable Master Hua Memorial Lecture series began. In 2001, the Institute for World Religions published the inaugural issue of its academic journal, Religion East & West. In 2006, DRBU established the Berkeley campus with Reverend Heng Sure, Ph.D., as its first director. In 2011, DRBU launched the university blog, dharmas. In 2013, DRBU began its two new programs, BA in Liberal Arts and MA in Buddhist Classics, both approved by the California Bureau of Private Postsecondary Education (BPPE); from 2013 to 2015, DRBU phased out its six existing BPPE-approved degree programs.

In December, 2013, DRBU was granted Eligibility for WSCUC Candidacy and Initial Accreditation by the WASC Senior College and University Commission (WSCUC) Eligibility Review Committee for its two new programs. In June 2016, DRBU was granted Candidacy for Initial Accreditation with WSCUC. In February 2018, DRBU was granted accreditation by WSCUC.

Academics

Liberal Education in the broad Buddhist Tradition 
The name "Dharma Realm" is a Buddhist phrasing for the notion of the universe as part of the meaning of "university" - one that enables its member to embrace and portray an endless and vast vision that encompasses humanity and stretches throughout the universe. Hence, the name Dharma Realm Buddhist University (DRBU) expresses an Eastern rendering of the same idea: the university as a place devoted to understanding ourselves, the nature of the wider universe and its workings, and our place in it. DRBU employs a philosophy of educating while "developing inherent wisdom," a model grounded in Buddhist values and one that founder Venerable Master Hsuan Hua was a proponent of. Its mission is to educate the whole person, seeking to change the mind, true the heart, and touch the spirit.

Because DRBU shares a campus with a Buddhist monastery, students engage in academic and intellectual inquiry while living in a contemplative setting. DRBU's pedagogy is a variation on the "Great Books" model, where learning stems from close reading of primary texts and group discussion in a system of "shared inquiry", as well as integrated Contemplative Exercises both in and outside of the classroom.

Contemplative Practices at DRBU 
In addition to Contemplative Exercises during classroom time, every semester, all classes and non-essential service scholarship are suspended so that whole university community can engage in a week-long Contemplative Exercise Immersion (CEI). Designed and run by DRBU faculty, the CEI is a full time retreat for students, faculty and staff held on university grounds.  According to DRBU, the CEI retreat is meant as an important "laboratory” experience where "students can unplug from their ordinary routines to directly experience a variety of disciplined forms of self-reflection, centering practices, and more intuitive modes of knowing—all aimed at increasing a subtler awareness within and without: of oneself, and one’s place in the larger world."

Academic Programs 
DRBU has two degree programs and a graduate certificate program: a Bachelor of Arts in Liberal Arts, a Master of Arts in Buddhist Classics and a Graduate Certificate in Buddhist Translation. The curriculum of all three programs is sequential; students travel through their respective programs as a cohort. 

 The BA in Liberal Arts is a four-year program that combines classical texts from both Eastern and Western traditions, as well as courses in mathematics, natural science, and music. Students also study Classical Chinese and Sanskrit, thereby familiarizing themselves with the original languages of many of the texts they are studying.

 The MA in Buddhist Classics is a two-year program focusing on primary Buddhist texts and equipping students with skills in language and hermeneutics. For language study, students may choose either Classical Chinese or Sanskrit (or both).

 The Graduate Certificate in Buddhist Translation is a integrated two-semester program that combines translation of Buddhist texts from Chinese into English with study, spiritual practice, and service in a contemplative setting.

Reading List (BA in Liberal Arts, by strand) 
The BA program integrated curriculum that weaves together ten distinct strands: Buddhist Classics, Western Classics, Indian Classics, Chinese Classics, Language, Mathematics, Natural Science, Rhetoric and Writing, Music, and Capstone.

Buddhist Classics

Western Classics

Chinese Classics

Indian Classics

Mathematics

Natural Science

Rhetoric and Writing

Music

Reading List (MA in Buddhist Classics, by strand) 
The MA graduate program consists of courses from four distinct strands: Buddhist Classics, Comparative Hermeneutics, Buddhist Hermeneutics, and Language.

Buddhist Classics 
 Sūtra: The Dharma Jewel Platform Sutra of the Sixth Patriarch，Explication of Underlying Meaning, Śūraṅgama Sūtra, Lotus Sūtra, Avataṃsaka Sūtra
 Sutta: Majjhima Nikāya,  Saṃyutta Nikāya,  Aṅguttara Nikāya,  Dīgha Nikāya 
 Śāstra: Ācariya Anuruddha’s Abhidhammattha Sangaha, Nāmarūpapariccheda (Manual of Defining Mind & Matter),  Vīryaśrīdatta’s Arthaviniścayasūtranibandhana,  Vasubandhu’s Abhidharmakośabhāṣya,  Yogācārabhūmi，Vasubandhu’s Śāstra on the Door to Understanding the One Hundred Dharmas, commentaries on Vasubandhu’s Triṃśikā by Sthiramati and Xuan Zhuang

Comparative Hermeneutics 
 selected work by Plato, Rene Descartes, David Hume, Immanual Kant, G.W.H. Hegel, Karl Marx, Arthur Schopenhauer, Friedrich Nietzsche, William James, Sigmund Freud, Carl Jung, Edmund Husserl, Martin Heidegger, Ludwig Wittgenstein, Jean-Paul Sartre, Jacques Lacan, Pierre Hadot, Jean-François Lyotard, Gilles Deleuze, Luce Irigaray, Slavoj Zizek, Judith Butler.

Buddhist Hermeneutics 
 Sūtra: Mahāpadesa, Catuḥpratisaraṇasūtra,  Cullavagga, Diamond Sūtra, Heart Sūtra,
 The Ten Doors of the Avataṃsaka Prologue by Qing Liang
 Biographical and autobiographical works include: Therīgāthā (Verses and Poems of Early Buddhist Nuns); The Dhamma Teaching of Acariya Maha Boowa; The Venerable Phra Acharn Mun Bhuridatta Thera; The Autobiography of Phra Ajaan Lee; The Autobiography of Ch’an Master Han Shan; Empty Cloud: The Autobiography of the Chinese Zen Master by Xuyun; The Ten Foot Square Hut (Hōjōki) by Kamo no Chōmei; and poetry selections.

Affiliated organizations

Buddhist Text Translation Society 
DRBU is also in close collaboration with the Buddhist Text Translation Society (BTTS), and faculty and students have published books on spirituality and world religions with the BTTS. Students can also publish works in Vajra Bodhi Sea, the monthly journal of orthodox Buddhism published continuously since 1970.

Institute for World Religions 
The Institute for World Religions (now located on the Berkeley campus) was established with the goal that harmony among the world's religions is an indispensable prerequisite for a just and peaceful world, and to affirm humanity's common bonds and rise above narrow sectarian differences. Catholic Cardinal Yu Bin was the first director in 1976.   It  has one of the longest Buddhist Christian interfaith dialogues in the country, with the Zen-Chan Buddhist Catholic Dialogue occurring annually since 2002.

Religion East & West 
Religion East & West is the academic journal of the Institute for World Religions.

Campus

City of Ten Thousand Buddhas 
At the City of Ten Thousand Buddhas (CTTB), DRBU shares a campus with the monastic community of monks and nuns, resident volunteers, and the Instilling Goodness Elementary School and Developing Virtue Secondary School. The campus encompasses over 70 buildings on more than 700 acres.

Facilities 
At CTTB, students take their meals with the rest of the community in the Five Contemplations Dining Hall (built in 1982). In accordance with the principle of compassion toward all beings, all meals served on campus are vegetarian. In addition, the Jyun Kang Vegetarian Restaurant is on the campus. 

A two-story library holds numerous Buddhist canons and commentaries in multiple languages, as well as audio-visual materials and computer resources. The Hall of Ten Thousand Buddhas is the spiritual hub of CTTB, with ceremonies and meditation taking place daily between 4:00 am and 9:30 pm, as well as several retreats throughout the year.

DRBU is currently renovating one of the buildings on campus to be the future DRBU building.

Sudhana Center 
DRBU acquired the Sudhana Center in the summer of 2015. It is a 5-acre university campus for events and long-term classes, located in west Ukiah.

Student life

Student organizations 
According to DRBU's website "DRBU Student Activities offers diverse opportunities for learning, encourages student leadership and community engagement, and promotes healthy, balanced and active lifestyles among the student body." 

Some student clubs include:

 Student Magazine- Mirror Flower Water Moon is a print and digital magazine published two times a year. Each issue has a theme and invites submissions of visual art, academic work, personal reflections, fiction, poetry, and more. The magazine is led and edited by a team of BA and MA students.
 Three Treasures Tea Club
 Pali Club
 Kalyāṇa Tea Club
 Architecture and Design Club 
 Yoga Club (Instructional)
 Tai-chi Club (Instructional)
 Pottery Club (Instructional)

References

External links 
 

Buddhist universities and colleges in the United States
Dharma Realm Buddhist Association
Universities and colleges in Mendocino County, California
Liberal arts colleges in California
Liberal arts colleges at universities in the United States
Schools accredited by the Western Association of Schools and Colleges
Educational institutions by country
Private universities and colleges in California
1976 establishments in California
Chan Buddhism
Progressive colleges
Alternative education
Great Books